Abu Faris Abd al-Aziz II ibn Ahmad was Marinid Sultan of Morocco from 1393 to 1396.

Life 
Abdul Aziz II succeeded Abul Abbas Ahmad Mustanzir in 1393.  During his rule the state was effectively ruled by the vizier.
He was succeeded by his brother Abdallah ibn Ahmad II in 1396.

References
Citations

Sources

14th-century Berber people
14th-century monarchs in Africa
14th-century Moroccan people
Marinid sultans of Morocco
People from Fez, Morocco